This is a list of works by architect Minoru Yamasaki.

 Federal Reserve Bank of Chicago Detroit Branch Building annex, Detroit, Michigan, 1951
 Pruitt–Igoe housing project, St. Louis, Missouri, 1954 (demolished in 1972)
 Gratiot Urban Redevelopment Project, Detroit, Michigan, 1954
 University Liggett School, Main Campus, Grosse Pointe, Michigan, 1954
 Military Personnel Records Center, St. Louis, Missouri, 1955
 Land's Pharmacy, Royal Oak, Michigan, 1955
 United States Consulate in Kobe, Japan 1955
 Lambert-St. Louis International Airport main terminal, 1956
 Woodrow Wilson Elementary School Westland, Michigan, 1956 (demolished in August, 1998)
 Birmingham Unitarian Church, Bloomfield Hills, Michigan, 1956
 McGregor Memorial Conference Center, Wayne State University, Detroit, 1957
 College for Creative Studies, Yamasaki Building, Detroit, 1957
 Albert Schweitzer Elementary School, Westland, Michigan, 1957
 John Marshall Junior High School, Westland, Michigan, 1958
 Michigan State Medical Society building, East Lansing, Michigan, 1959
 Prentis Building and DeRoy Auditorium Complex, Wayne State University, Detroit, 1959 
 Reynolds Metals Regional Sales Office, Southfield, Michigan, 1959
 United States Pavilion, World Agricultural Fair, New Delhi, India, 1959
 Columbia Records Pitman Pressing Plant, Pitman, New Jersey, 1960 
 Dhahran International Airport - Civil Air Terminal, Saudi Arabia, 1961 
 Carleton College buildings: Olin Hall of Science 1961, Goodhue Dormitory 1962, West Gym 1964, Cowling Rec Center 1965, Watson Hall 1966 and 1961 4th Floor addition to Myers Hall, Northfield, Minnesota
 Master plan for Wascana Centre and buildings for the University of Regina, including the Dr. John Archer Library, Regina, Saskatchewan, 1961–1967
 Pacific Science Center (formerly known as the Federal Science Pavilion for Seattle's Century 21 World's Fair), Seattle, Washington, 1962
 Irwin Library, Butler University, Indianapolis, Indiana, 1963
 Michigan Consolidated Gas Building - (Now One Woodward Avenue), Detroit, Michigan, 1963
 Daniell Heights married student housing, Michigan Technological University, Houghton, Michigan, 1963
 Oberlin Conservatory of Music (photo), Oberlin College, Ohio, 1963
 IBM Building, Seattle, Washington, 1963
 North Shore Congregation Israel, Glencoe, Illinois 1964
 Northwestern National Life Building (now Voya Financial), Minneapolis, Minnesota, 1964
 Queen Emma Gardens (two high-rise towers), Honolulu, Hawaii, 1964
 Engineering Sciences Laboratory, Harvard University, Cambridge, Massachusetts,
 Robertson Hall, Princeton School of Public and International Affairs, Princeton University, Princeton, New Jersey, 1965
 William James Hall Behavioral Sciences Building (William James Hall), Harvard University, Cambridge, Massachusetts, 1965
 Century Plaza Hotel, Los Angeles, California, 1966
 King Building, Oberlin College, 1966
 Peyton Hall, Department of Astrophysical Sciences, Princeton University, Princeton, New Jersey, 1966
 Quo Vadis Entertainment Center, Westland, Michigan, 1966 (demolished in June 2011)
 M&T Bank Center, Buffalo, New York, 1967
 Japan Center, San Francisco, California, 1968
 1350 Ala Moana, Honolulu, Hawaii, 1968
 Eastern Airlines Terminal, (Logan Airport Terminal A) Boston, Massachusetts, 1969 (demolished in 2002).
 World Trade Center Tower 1, Tower 2, Building 4, 5 and 6, 1970 and 1971, New York City (destroyed on September 11, 2001)
 Montgomery Ward Corporate Headquarters Tower, Chicago, Illinois, 1972 (converted into high-rise residential condominiums in 2005)
 Minoru and Teruko Yamasaki House, Bloomfield Township, Michigan, 1972
 Temple Beth El, Bloomfield Township, Michigan 1974
 Century Plaza Towers, Los Angeles, 1975
 U.S. Bank Tower, Denver, 1975
 Tulsa Performing Arts Center, Tulsa, Oklahoma, 1976
 One Government Center (now Michael DiSalle Government Center), Toledo, Ohio, 1976
 Steinman College Center, Franklin and Marshall College, Lancaster, Pennsylvania, 1976
 Bank of Oklahoma, Tulsa, Oklahoma, 1977
 Rainier Bank Tower, Seattle, Washington, 1977
 Federal Reserve Bank of Richmond, Richmond, Virginia, 1978 
 Horace Mann Educators Corporation, Springfield, Illinois, 1979
 Sheraton Miyako Hotel Tokyo, Tokyo, Japan, 1979
 100 Washington Square, Minneapolis, Minnesota, 1981
 Saudi Arabian Monetary Agency Head Office, Riyadh, Saudi Arabia, 1981
 Founder's Hall, Shinji Shumeikai, Shiga Prefecture, Japan, 1982
 Eastern Province International Airport, Saudi Arabia, 1985
 Istanbul Cevahir, Istanbul, Turkey, designed 1987, constructed 1997-2005
 Torre Picasso, Madrid, Spain, 1988
 1st Source Center (originally Standard Federal Plaza), Fort Wayne, Indiana, 1987-1989
 Columbia Center, Troy, Michigan, 1989–2000
 Colonnade Plaza (formerly the Mutual of Omaha Bank Building), Miami, Florida
 Lincoln Elementary School, Livonia, Michigan (demolished in mid-1980s)
 Medical College of Ohio Hospital and Medical College of Ohio, now University of Toledo
 Shiraz University in Shiraz, Iran
Grant Elementary School, Livonia, Michigan, 1956

References

 01
Yamasaki, Minoru
Yamasaki, Minoru